Podperebor is a rural locality (a village) in Pereborskoye Rural Settlement, Beryozovsky District, Perm Krai, Russia. The population was 3 as of 2010.

Geography 
Podperebor is located on the Shakva River, 20 km north of  Beryozovka (the district's administrative centre) by road. Perebor is the nearest rural locality.

References 

Rural localities in Beryozovsky District, Perm Krai